Achtkarspelen is a municipality in Friesland in the northern Netherlands.

History
The name Achtkarspelen, literally meaning "eight parishes", is derived from the original eight parishes within the grietenij, namely: Augustinusga, Buitenpost (the capital), Drogeham, De Kooten, Kortwoude, Lutkepost, Surhuizum and Twijzel. Achtkarspelen held a separate status within Friesland for many years. In the Middle Ages Achtkarspelen fell under the Bishopric of Münster, meanwhile the rest of Friesland was a part of the Bishopric of Utrecht.

The grietenij Achtkarspelen became a municipality in 1851 as a result of the Municipality Act of Minister of the Interior Johan Rudolph Thorbecke.

Population centres 

The administrative centre in the municipality is Buitenpost.

Notable people 
 Derk Holman (1916 in Buitenpost – 1982 in Groningen) a Dutch sculptor and ceramist
 Louw de Graaf (born 1930 in Kootstertille) a retired Dutch politician and trade union leader. 
 Gerriet Postma (1932 in Twijzelerheide – 2009) a Dutch painter 
 Johannes Lützen Bouma (born 1934 in Twijzelerheide) a Dutch economist and academic 
 David Porcelijn (born 1947 in Achtkarspelen) a Dutch composer and conductor
 Joop Atsma (born 1956 in Surhuisterveen) a Dutch politician and sport administrator. 
 Meindert Talma (born 1968 in Surhuisterveen) a Dutch lo-fi singer and keyboardist
 Oedo Kuipers (born 1989 in Stroobos) a Dutch singer and actor in musical theatre

Gallery

References

External links

 

 
Municipalities of Friesland